Why is the fourth Korean-language studio album by South Korean girl group Baby V.O.X. It was released on May 16, 2000, by DR Music. The lead single Why did well in the Korean Music Charts. The album sold about 200,000 copies in South Korea.

Track listing 
 Why
 배신 (Betrayal)
 회상 (Recall)
 허락 (Consent)
 Overlap
 슬픈 별에서 (In the Sad Star)
 Bad Boy
 올가미 (Lasso)
 Before Sunrise
 Patron
 Why (MR)

Members during this release 
Kim E-Z

Shim Eun-Jin

Kan Mi-Youn

Yoon Eun-Hye

Lee Hee-Jin

References

DR Music albums
Baby V.O.X. albums
2000 albums